Josh Roberts may refer to:

 Joshua Roberts (born 1986), Australian baseball and rugby league player
 Josh Roberts (athlete), American Paralympic athlete, see United States at the 2012 Summer Paralympics